Moechotypa coomani is a species of beetle in the family Cerambycidae. It was described by Pic in 1934. It is known from Laos, Cambodia, and Vietnam.

References

coomani
Beetles described in 1934